{{Infobox civil conflict
| latitude =
| longitude =
|image = César Chávez with John Giumarra and others ending CA Grape Strike.jpg
|caption = César Chávez shakes hands with John Giumarra Jr. after signing an agreement to end the strike
|date = 
|place = Delano, California
| coordinates =
| goals   = Increased wages and working conditions
| methods = Strikes, boycotting, demonstrations
| status  =
| result  = Collective bargaining agreement 
| concessions =
| side1= Agricultural Workers Organizing Committee
United Farm Workers
| side2= Table grape growers
 Schenley Industries
 DiGiorgio Corporation
| leadfigures1= Larry ItliongLupe MartinezCesar ChavezDolores Huerta
| leadfigures2=
| casualties1=
| casualties2=
| map_type =
| map_size =
| map_caption =
| howmany1=  2,000+ Filipino Americans1,200+ Mexican AmericansTotal:10,000+
| howmany2=
| sidebox =  
}}
The Delano grape strike' was a labor strike organized by the Agricultural Workers Organizing Committee (AWOC), a predominantly Filipino and AFL-CIO-sponsored labor organization, against table grape growers in Delano, California to fight against the exploitation of farm workers. The strike began on September 8, 1965, and one week later, the predominantly Mexican National Farmworkers Association (NFWA) joined the cause.Feriss, Susan; Sandoval, Ricardo; and Hembree, Diana. The Fight in the Fields: Cesar Chavez and the Farmworkers Movement. New York: Houghton Mifflin Courtyard, 1998.  In August 1966, the AWOC and the NFWA merged to create the United Farm Workers (UFW) Organizing Committee.Hurt, R. Douglas and for farm growers to cease exposing farm workers to dangerous pesticides. American Agriculture: A Brief History. Lafayette, Ind.: Purdue University Press, 2002. 

The strike lasted for five years and was characterized by its grassroots efforts—consumer boycotts, marches, community organizing and nonviolent resistance—which gained the movement national attention.Weber, Devra. Dark Sweat, White Gold: California Farm Workers, Cotton, and the New Deal. Berkeley, Calif.: University of California Press, 1996.  On July 1970, the strike resulted in a victory for farm workers, due largely to a consumer boycott of non-union grapes, when a collective bargaining agreement was reached with major table grape growers, affecting more than 10,000 farm workers.

The Delano grape strike is most notable for the effective implementation and adaptation of boycotts, the unprecedented partnership between Filipino and Mexican farm workers to unionize farm labor, and the resulting creation of the UFW labor union, all of which revolutionized the farm labor movement in America.

 Background 
Preceding the Delano grape strike was another grape strike organized by Filipino farm workers that occurred in Coachella Valley, California on May 3, 1965. Because the majority of strikers were over 50 years old and did not have families of their own due to anti-miscegenation laws, they were willing to risk what little they had to fight for higher wages. The strike succeeded in granting farm workers a 40-cent-per-hour raise, which resulted in a wage equivalent to the $1.40-per-hour wage that the recently outlawed braceros were paid. After the strike in Coachella, farm workers followed the grape-picking season and moved north to Delano. The Filipino farm workers who came up from Coachella were led by Larry Itliong, Philip Vera Cruz, Benjamin Gines, and Elasco under the AWOC. Upon arriving in Delano, the farm workers were told by growers that instead of being paid the $1.40-per-hour wage they received in Coachella, they would be paid $1.20-per-hour, which was below the federal minimum wage. Despite attempts at negotiation, growers were not willing to raise wages since workers were easily replaceable. This pushed Itliong, who was the leader of the AWOC, to organize Filipino farm workers and pressure growers into granting them higher wages and better working conditions. On September 7, 1965, Itliong and Filipino farm workers gathered inside Filipino Community Hall, and the AWOC unanimously voted to go on strike the next morning.

 Events of the strike 

On September 8, 1965, Itliong, Vera Cruz, Gines, Imutan, and more than 1,000 Filipino farm workers walked off of vineyards and began their strike against Delano table grape growers. In response to strikers, grape growers hired Mexican farm workers to cross the picket lines and break the strike, a tactic typically used to create conflict and reinforce divisions between Filipino and Mexican farm workers. To prevent the strike from ending in failure, Itliong sought out the help of Cesar Chavez, who was the leader of the newly established NFWA. Chavez initially declined Itliong's request because he believed the NFWA was not financially stable enough to join the strike. However, because NFWA members expressed a desire to support the Filipinos' efforts, Chavez decided to hold an emergency conference at the Our Lady of Guadalupe Church (Iglesia Nuestra Señora de Guadalupe) on September 16 to allow NFWA members to decide for themselves whether or not to join the struggle at Delano. A crowd of more than twelve hundred supporters attended the meeting and overwhelmingly voted in favor of joining the strike, with members of Chavez's organization repeatedly chanting, "Huelga!" – the Spanish word for strike – in favor of supporting the Delano grape farmer workers. September 16, 1965 marked the day that Filipino and Mexican farm workers officially joined forces to picket together and fight for farm labor justice.

On March 17, 1966 Cesar Estrada Chavez embarked on a 300-mile pilgrimage from Delano, California to the state's capital of Sacramento. This was an attempt to pressure the growers and the state government to answer the demands of the Mexican American and Filipino American farm workers which represented the Filipino-dominated Agricultural Workers Organizing Committee and the Mexican-dominated National Farm Workers Association, led by Cesar Chavez. The pilgrimage was also intended to bring widespread public attention to the farm worker's cause. Shortly after this, the National Farm Workers Association and the Agricultural Workers Organizing Committee merged and became known as the United Farm Workers Organizing Committee. In August 1966, the AFL-CIO charted the UFW, officially combining the AWOC and the NFWA.

After a record harvest in the fall of 1965, thousands of California farm workers went on strike and demanded union representation elections. Many were arrested by police and injured by growers while picketing. The growers used many tactics to intimidate and harass the picketers. The growers were sure the strikers would maintain a position of nonviolence. The growers would push protesters, punch the strikers and jab elbows in to their ribs. Some growers drove their cars towards the protesters and swerving just as they reached the strikers. There were several cases where pesticide spraying equipment was used to drench picketers with deadly surfer, which temporarily blinded them. Chavez continued to encourage the people to "not react against the violence, but to react in such a way to get closer to our goal". There was a lot of support towards nonviolent protest across the country and he wanted to continue with that focus. Chavez stated "we can change the world if we do it nonviolent". Chavez sent two workers and a student activist to follow a grape shipment from one of the picketed growers to the end destination at the Oakland docks. Once there, the protestors were instructed to persuade the longshoremen to refrain from loading the shipment of grapes. The group was successful in its course of action, and this resulted in the spoilage of a thousand ten-ton cases of grapes which were left to rot on the docks. This event sparked the decision to use the protest tactic of boycotting as the means by which the labor movement would win the struggle against the Delano grape growers.

This initial successful boycott was followed by a series of picket lines on Bay Area docks. The International Longshoremen's and Warehousemen's Union, whose members were responsible for loading the shipments, cooperated with the protesters and refused to load non-union grapes.

Chavez's successful boycotting campaigns in the docks inspired him to launch a formal boycott against the two largest corporations which were involved in the Delano grape industry, Schenley Industries and the DiGiorgio Corporation.

Starting in December 1965, Chavez's organization participated in several consumer boycotts against the Schenley corporation. The increased pressure from supporters in the business sector led to the farm workers’ victory and acquisition of union contracts that immediately raised wages and established hiring halls in Delano, Coachella, and Lamont.

The large corporations affected by the strikes led by Chavez employed fear tactics in order to protect profits. The documentary The Wrath of Grapes'' mentions that the Delano-based company, M Caratan Inc., hired criminals to break up farm workers voting to unionize. They attacked voters, overturned tables and even smashed ballot boxes.

The DiGiorgio Corporation was finally pressured into holding an election among its workers allowing them to choose the union they wanted to represent them on August 30, 1967. This came as a result of the boycott tactic of blocking grape distribution centers. With their products not on the shelves of retailers as a result of the boycott, the DiGiorgio Corporation was pressured to answer to the demands of the farm workers. The result of the vote favored the union representation of the UFW, a 530 to 332 vote, against the representation of The Teamsters, which was the only union that was competing against the UFW in the election.

On July 29, 1970, the grape strike and boycott ended, when grape growers signed labor contracts with the union. The contracts included timed pay increase, health, and other benefits.

Geography
The grape strike officially began in Delano in September 1965. In December, union representatives traveled from California to New York, Washington, D.C., Pittsburgh, Detroit, and other large cities to encourage a boycott of grapes grown at ranches without UFW contracts.

In the summer of 1966, unions and religious groups from Seattle and Portland endorsed the boycott. Supporters formed a boycott committee in Vancouver, prompting an outpouring of support from Canadians that would continue throughout the following years.

In 1967, UFW supporters in Oregon began picketing stores in Eugene, Salem, and Portland. After melon workers went on strike in Texas, growers held the first union representation elections in the region, and the UFW became the first union to ever sign a contract with a grower in Texas.

National support for the UFW continued to grow in 1968, and hundreds of UFW members and supporters were arrested. Picketing continued throughout the country, including in Massachusetts, New Jersey, Ohio, Oklahoma, and Florida. The mayors of New York, Baltimore, Philadelphia, Buffalo, Detroit, and other cities pledged their support, and many of them altered their cities’ grape purchases to support the boycott.

In 1969, support for farm workers increased throughout North America. The grape boycott spread into the South as civil rights groups pressured grocery stores in Atlanta, Miami, New Orleans, Nashville, and Louisville to remove non-union grapes. Student groups in New York protested the Department of Defense and accused them of deliberately purchasing boycotted grapes. On May 10, UFW supporters picketed Safeway stores throughout the U.S. and Canada in celebration of International Grape Boycott Day. Cesar Chavez also went on a speaking tour along the East Coast to ask for support from labor groups, religious groups, and universities.

Mapping UFW Strikes, Boycotts, and Farm Worker Actions 1965-1975 shows over 1,000 farm worker strikes, boycotts, and other actions.

Issues within the Grape Strike Union 

It took a lot of effort and planning before the grape strike was able to take place. There were different conflicts between groups and people participating. In the beginning, it was only Filipino-American labor organizer Larry Itliong’s creation of the Agricultural Workers Organizing Committee (AWOC), mostly made up of Filipinos. He recruited many people and eventually was asked to move to Delano to lead Filipino grape farmers. He soon realized he cannot do this on his own and will need a bigger union. He then reached out to Caesar Chavez, who led the Mexicans and the National Farm Workers Association and merged groups to form the United Farm Workers (UFW). There were some bumps in the road. Before the merger, each group had fears of getting dominated by the other group. Itliong and Chavez also had their hesitations in working together, but they knew the merger needed to happen in order to make a difference. Despite having differences, the farmers worked together and got the pay raise and the additional bonus per grape box and better working conditions. Much after the strike, Itliong decided to leave the UFW due to disagreements and different views.

Impact of the strike

The Delano strike and the events that transpired throughout 1960 to 1975 resulted in a victory for the UFW and farm workers. By 1968, the UFW had signed contracts with 10 different table grape growers, which included Schenley Industries and DiGiorgio Corporation, but strikes and boycotts did not cease until 1970, when 26 table grape growers signed contracts with the UFW. Contracts between the UFW and grape growers were the first of their kind in agricultural history, and alongside the immediate effects of these initial contracts such as the increase in wages and improved working conditions, some contracts included provisions regarding unemployment insurance, paid vacation days, and the creation of a special benefits fund.

After the end of the grape strike in 1970, a strike against lettuce growers began. This led to conflict with the Teamsters union, in the Salinas Valley.

In June 1975, California passed a law allowing for secret ballot union representation elections for farm workers. By mid-September, the UFW won the right to represent 4,500 workers at 24 farms, while the Teamsters won the right to represent 4,000 workers at 14 farms. The UFW won the majority of the elections in which it participated.

The Teamsters signed an agreement with the UFW in 1977, promising to end its efforts to represent farm workers. The boycott of grapes, lettuce, and Gallo Winery products officially ended in 1978.

Despite the successes achieved by the UFW, there were also negative outcomes that farm workers experienced. The most significant of these was the deteriorated relationship between the Filipino and Mexican farm workers. In the initial contracts, the UFW implemented the hiring hall system. The hiring hall system was established with the intent of ending farm workers' migration cycle, which the UFW believed would make for more organized and efficient harvesting. However, the hiring hall system split up many of the Filipino who had grown accustomed to migrating with the harvesting season.

Following the strike, the actions of Cesar Chavez were highlighted and remembered.  The 2014 film Cesar Chavez highlights his role in the labor movement. Less remembered are the many others who supported him during the strike.  Particularly forgotten was the efforts of Filipino Americans in the strike. For example, in the 2014 film, the Filipinos role was largely absent, except for one speaking line and a few group shots.

References

External links

 National Park Service: "Workers United: The Delano Grape Strike and Boycott"
 Mapping UFW Strikes, Boycotts, and Farm Worker Actions 1965-1975: An interactive map with over 1,000 farm worker strikes, boycotts, and other actions, as well as a timeline and an essay.
 Official Site of the United Farmworkers
 Farmworker Movement Documentation Project
 Fight In The Fields, PBS documentary on Chavez and the UFW's history
 The Jerry Cohen '63 Papers at Amherst College

Agriculture and forestry labor disputes in the United States
Agricultural labor in the United States
History of Latino civil rights
Labor disputes in California
Labor history of California
Labor disputes in Texas
United Farm Workers
Cesar Chavez
Economic history of California
History of Kern County, California
History of the San Joaquin Valley
Filipino-American history
1960s in the United States
1965 labor disputes and strikes
1966 labor disputes and strikes
1967 labor disputes and strikes
1968 labor disputes and strikes
1969 labor disputes and strikes
1970 labor disputes and strikes